As One is a live album by bassist Richard Davis recorded in 1975 and released on the Muse label.

Reception
Allmusic awarded the album 3 stars.

Track listing 
All compositions by Richard Davis except as indicated
 "Blue Bossa" (Kenny Dorham) - 7:42   
 "All Blues" (Miles Davis) - 13:29   
 "Blue Monk" (Thelonious Monk) - 6:35   
 "Speak Low" (Kurt Weill, Ogden Nash) - 5:27   
 "Fuge 'N" - 9:39

Personnel 
Richard Davis - bass
Jill McManus - piano

References 

Richard Davis (bassist) live albums
1976 live albums
Muse Records live albums